Syngonorthus is a monotypic moth genus in the family Geometridae. Its only species, Syngonorthus subpunctatus, is found in Borneo and Sumatra. Both the genus and species were described by Arthur Gardiner Butler in 1892.

References

Abraxini